Davison is a city in Genesee County in the U.S. state of Michigan and a suburb of Flint. The population was 5,536 at the 2000 census and fell to 5,173 by the 2010 census. Davison is located within Davison Township survey township area (7N 8E), but is administratively autonomous.

Davison was named after Judge Norman Davison, a judge of Lapeer County and a delegate to state constitution convention of 1835. He resided in a nearby hamlet formerly known as Davisonville, now known as Atlas.

History

Davison Station
Township section 3, 9 and 10 was Davison Station, which was first settled in 1842 by Eleazer Thurston in section 10. The line of the Chicago and Lake Huron Railroad (now Canadian National Railway) through the settlement was finished in 1871 marked the beginning of Davison Station. The first saw mill in the township was also built here that year by Dunn and Darling. The township and the settlement had in 1872 a number of firsts: doctor, L. W. Hanson, merchant Damon Stewart and tavern owned and operated by Henry S. Rising. On , Davison Station post office open with Stewart as the postmaster. The Free Will Baptist Church, formed in 1859 at and hosted at Herrick Schoolhouse two miles away, moved to a frame church building in the village in 1872.

In 1873, a cheese factory and flouring mill opened.

Davison Village
Davison was incorporated as a village on May 20, 1889. On April 30, 1894, part of downtown, dubbed the Rotten Row, caught fire and wiped the section out. By 1895, the village had a Rosemoor Park with a race track used for horse then add cars. In 1916, the village had an auditorium, a state bank, Masonic and Odd Fellows lodges, four churches, the Catholic, the Methodist Episcopal, the Free Methodist and the Baptist. The estimated population was 700. Rosemoor Park began in 1919 hold the county fair every year except one until 1938.

Davison City
In 1943, Rosemoor Park closed permanently. The track's owner in 1946 developed a subdivision on the track property.

In January 2010, it was announced that Davison City Manager Dale Martin and Davison Township, Michigan Supervisor Kurt Soper had begun preliminary meetings discussing the possibility of merging the two municipalities.

Geography

Demographics

2010 census
As of the census of 2010, there were 5,173 people, 2,371 households, and 1,314 families residing in the city.  The population density was 2,617.9 per square mile.  The racial makeup of the city was 94.9% White, 1.8% African American, 0.3% Native American, 0.3% Asian, 0% Pacific Islander, 0.7% from other races, and 2% from two or more races. Hispanic or Latino of any race were 2.9% of the population.

The 2010 census lists 2,371 households, out of which 640 (27%) had children under the age of 18 living with them, 837 (35.3%) were married couples living together, 349 (14.7%) had a female householder with no husband present, and 1,057 (44.6%) were non-families. 936 (39.5%) of all households were made up of individuals, and 492 (18.1%) had someone living alone who was 65 years of age or older.  The average household size was 2.18 and the average family size was 2.91. In the city, the population was spread out, with 25.8% aged birth to 19, 12.1% from 20 to 29, 12.6% from 30 to 39, 13.1% from 40 to 49, 13% 50 to 59, 11.1% from 60 to 69, and  12.1% who were 70 years of age or older.  The median age was 39.5 years.

According to the American Community Survey, 2010, The median income for a household in the city was $37,793, and the mean income for a household was $48,643. The per capita income for the city was $23,132.  About 14.5% of families and 17.5% of the city population were below the poverty line, with 26.6% of those being under age 18 and 5.2% of those age 65 or over.

Government
The municipality operates its own well water system.

The city has a council-manager government, with the position of city manager currently being held by Andrea Schroeder. The Davison City Council is composed of 7 members, including the mayor. The Mayor of Davison, a position currently held by Tim Bishop, is mostly titular, with most of the executive power being vested in the city manager.

City Council Members

Notable people

 Kathleen Flinn, an award-winning journalist and New York Times bestselling author. Her memoir, Burnt Toast Makes You Sing Good about her life growing up in Davison was named a 2015 Michigan Notable Book by the Library of Michigan.
 Thomas C. Hart, a U.S. Navy admiral and Asiatic Fleet commander during World War II
 Michael Moore, Academy Award-winning filmmaker, was born in 1954 at St. Joseph's Hospital in Flint, Michigan, spent most of his childhood in Davison, and graduated from Davison High School in 1972.
Ken Morrow, professional ice hockey defenseman and Stanley Cup winner who played in the 1980 Miracle on Ice game was raised in Davison.
 John Sinclair, poet, human rights activist, manager of the MC5, and founder of the anti-racist White Panther Party was raised in Davison.
Tim Thomas, NHL goalie

References

External links

Cities in Genesee County, Michigan
1842 establishments in Michigan
Populated places established in 1842